

List of orders of magnitude for temperature

Detailed list for 100 K to 1000 K
Most ordinary human activity takes place at temperatures of this order of magnitude. Circumstances where water naturally occurs in liquid form are shown in light grey.

SI multiples

References

External links
Online Temperature Conversion

Temperature
Threshold temperatures